Gabbi is a Khatri Hindu clan, generally found in Punjab, India. Notable people with the name include:

Gabbi Garcia (born 1998), Filipino actress, singer, model, vlogger and recording artist
Wamiqa Gabbi, Indian film actress

See also
Gabby
Gabbai

Indian surnames